Dorothy Jung Echols (September 9, 1916 – February 4, 1997) was an American Geologist. She was a Professor for the Department of Earth and Planetary Sciences at Washington University in St. Louis.

Biography 

Dorothy Jung Echols although born in The Bronx, grew up and attended high school in Brooklyn where she was asked about what her career aspirations were, to which she responded with “I like minerals”. She later became a prominent figure in geology for her time, making contributions in the Petroleum industry and later teaching as a professor in the department of Earth and Planetary Sciences at Washington University in St. Louis. During her career as a teacher she taught an introductory level course that was called Geology in the field , which consisted of weekend field trips throughout Missouri. Along with advanced and introductory paleontology courses. She impacted her students greatly and managed to connect with them as well. Echols received her Bachelor of Arts degree in geology from New York University in 1936, where she also served as the captain of the Varsity Swim team from 1934 to 1935. She was also a member of the Women's Swimming Association, receiving the Florence Frankel medal for displaying excellence in swimming. She later went on to receive her Masters Degree in Geology from Columbia University in 1938. After getting her master’s degree in 1938, she moved to Texas, hoping to get a job. Unfortunately, there didn’t seem to be a lot of room for female geologists at the time, especially not in the petroleum industry. A geologist in Houston even told her to try getting a job in a humble coffee shop where she could meet a husband. Eventually, in 1938 she got a job at Republic Production Company and worked there for three years as a Palaeontologist as well as a Micropaleontologist. In 1941 Dorothy married Leonard S. Echols and moved to New York. Together, they had four children: Leonard S. Echols III, Jon Jung Echols, Lizette DePue Echols, and William Ring Echols. Leonard was a research chemist working for Shell(Oil company). In 1942, they then moved to St. Louis and built their home. During 1946 to 1951, Dorothy became a geologic consultant for Pond Fork (Oil and gas company). Echols worked as a Laboratory Instructor for the Washington University in the Department of Geology in 1948. In 1951, Dorothy was hired as a research associate in the department to fill the position that her colleague, Betty Nadeau had filled prior. She continued to teach at the university until 1982, where she later retired from her position. Later that year, Echols received the Neil A. Miner Award from the National Association of Geology Teachers which is awarded to exceptional individuals that promote interest in earth sciences. She was the first woman ever elected president of the Geological Society of America. In January of 1977, she was diagnosed with lung cancer. Through she had good health all her life, the illness, unfortunately, caused her death on February 4, 1977.

Contributions to geology 

Echols became involved in the petroleum industry from 1938 to 1946 which led her to work on the Deep Sea Drilling Project.  During this time Echols was one of the few female geologist working in the petroleum industry. The Deep Sea Drilling Project, which gathered information that would help determine the age and processes of ocean basins, consulted her as shipboard Sedimentologist. In 1948 Echols explained [[Wilcox’s relationship with the Midway sea through time. Additionally, she found where and discovered that the petroleum deposits were so rich in that area due to the surrounding materials (basal sand, shale, etc.), and the interaction of these surrounding materials with one another. These interactions allowed for the petroleum to seep into the sands and become trapped in an impenetrable seal of rock. In addition, much of her career was spent in the field of micropaleontology, specializing in microfossils. Prior to American publication Echols was published in three Russian publications with her discovery of new Paleozoic Ostracode genera and species. These reports reclassified many species discovered in Russia as well as contained depictions and reclassifications of previously discovered genera and species. Echols was published in three separate reports in 1952, Netskaia A. I., Polinova E. N. and Zaspelova V. S. Afterwards, she published an article in the Micropaleontology magazine, titled "Chalk crayons and microfossil contamination" alongside Harold L. Levin, first published on January 1, 1964. In May 1966 Echols discovered that holotypes previously classified as Cephalopoda were structurally incompatible with this classification. She claimed they should rather be placed in the Monoplacophora based on cross-sectioning completed on fossils in the area. She found conclusive evidence that no specimen collected indicated any structures evident of being classified a Cephalopoda. In 1956, Echols pioneered the idea that Ostracod carapaces moved during Fern Glen Formation because of currents moving over shallow areas. This study was a vital foundation for further research. In 1961, Echols was involved in the discovery of an extinct species of Trilobite from the Kimmswick Limestone found in Missouri.

Awards and achievements 
Dorothy Jung Echols was known for her presence on the deep sea drilling project making her one of the first female geologist working in the petroleum field. Later on she was listed as a noteworthy geological consultant by Marquis who's who. After her years of teaching she was awarded the Neil A. Miner award for her contributions in the geological space.

In 1979 during her later years she and a close friend of hers Doris Malkin Curtis who had also participated in the deep sea drilling project created a geological consulting firm. This consulting firm was made to help with mapping out deposition which helped understand and locate hydrocarbons. The firm was named, 'Curtis and Echols'.

Publications 
Echols published many pieces of writing throughout her years studying and teaching geology at schools in America. Some of her most influential pieces are listed below.

In 1958, Echols along with Courtney Werner, wrote a journal of what they have studied and identified in the Maquoketa shale of Missouri. What they've found in their work was a light brown coloured shale which contained a varied fauna that lied deep within it. This included ostracizes, bryozoans, brachiopods, conodonts, pelecypods and quantities of pieces of unpressed and completely replaced graptolites that were unusually preserved beneath it. The unpressed graptolites belonged to the genus Climacograptus and possibly the Climacograptus putillus Hall. 

In 1956, Dorothy took part in writing a journal called the Journal of Paleontology, specifically written in volume 30. She worked with other writers; John J. Gouty on Fern Glen (Mississippian) Ostracoda, Bruce L. Stinchcomb on Missouri Upper Cambrian Monoplacophora previously considered cephalopods, and Courtney Werner on Three Dimensional Graptolites in the Maquoketa Shale (Upper Ordovician) of Missouri. The writings in the journal describes the journey and findings of Dorothy on the trips she took, her findings being animal fossils located in their original habitats. She was also able to collect samples of different rocks as well. Dorothy and John wrote in depth about their studies in fern glen (Mississippian) Ostracoda. They sectioned the land into 4 pieces allowing them to go deeper in research and collect sedimentary samples and within were Ostracods. Dorothy and bruce found a fossil locality where the animal's original location was. The structure of the fossils seemed to have cone-shaped forms and seemed to be curved.

References

1916 births
1977 deaths
American women geologists
20th-century American geologists
American paleontologists
Washington University in St. Louis faculty
Scientists from St. Louis
New York University alumni
Columbia Graduate School of Arts and Sciences alumni